Gemmula stupa is a species of sea snail, a marine gastropod mollusk in the family Turridae, the turrids.

Description
The length of the shell attains 35 mm.

Distribution
This marine species occurs off Taiwan..

References

 Lee Y.-C. 2001. Two new bathyal turrids (Gastropoda: Turridae) from West Pacific. Memoir, Malacological Society of Taiwan, 1: 7–9.

External links
 Gastropods.com: Gemmula stupa
  Tucker, J.K. 2004 Catalog of recent and fossil turrids (Mollusca: Gastropoda). Zootaxa 682:1-1295.

stupa
Gastropods described in 2001